Daniel John Edward Harris (27 May 1937) born in Penygraig, is a Welsh former rugby union, and professional rugby league footballer who played in the 1950s and 1960s. He played representative level rugby union (RU) for Wales, and at club level for Pontypridd RFC and Cardiff RFC, playing at Lock, i.e. number 4 or 5, and club level rugby league (RL) for Leigh.

International honours
Danny Harris won caps for Wales (RU) while at Pontypridd RFC in 1959 against Ireland, and France, while at Cardiff RFC in 1960 against Scotland, Ireland, France, and South Africa, and in 1961 against England, and Scotland.

References

External links
Search for "Harris" at rugbyleagueproject.org

Statistics at scrum.com
Statistics at wru.co.uk
Hall of Fame at ponty.net

1937 births
Living people
Cardiff RFC players
Footballers who switched code
Leigh Leopards players
Pontypridd RFC players
Rugby league players from Rhondda Cynon Taf
Rugby union locks
Rugby union players from Penygraig
Wales international rugby union players
Welsh rugby league players
Welsh rugby union players